Walter Mooney ( – ) was an English professional rugby league footballer who played as a  in the 1910s and 1920s. He played at international level for Great Britain and at club level for Leigh.

Playing career

International honours
Walter Mooney won caps for Great Britain while at Leigh in 1924 against New Zealand (2 matches).

Challenge Cup Final appearances
Walter Mooney played  and was captain in Leigh's 13-0 victory over Halifax in the 1920–21 Challenge Cup Final during the 1920–21 season at The Cliff, Broughton on Saturday 30 April 1921, in front of a crowd of 25,000.

County Cup Final appearances
Walter Mooney played, and scored a goal, in Leigh's 2-20 defeat by Wigan in the 1922 Lancashire County Cup Final during the 1922–23 season at The Willows, Salford on Saturday 25 November 1922.

References

External links
!Great Britain Statistics at englandrl.co.uk (statistics currently missing due to not having appeared for both Great Britain, and England)

1890s births
1958 deaths
English rugby league players
Great Britain national rugby league team players
Leigh Leopards captains
Leigh Leopards players
Rugby league five-eighths
Rugby league players from Leigh, Greater Manchester